Hsu Li Yang (born 1972) is a Singapore chess International Master. He won the national Singaporean Chess Championship in 1992 and 1993.  Represented Singapore three times in Chess Olympiads (1992, 1994, 2000). His current FIDE rating is 2427.

References

External links
 
 

1972 births
Living people
Singaporean sportspeople of Chinese descent
Singaporean chess players
Chess International Masters
Chess Olympiad competitors
20th-century Singaporean people